Hristo Kolev (born 21 September 1964) is a Bulgarian football manager and former player.

Nicknamed The Father, Kolev played as a midfielder. A skillful free-kick taker, he scored numerous goals from different positions, in a career which spanned almost 15 years.

Football career
Born in Asenovgrad, Kolev played as a youth for Lokomotiv Plovdiv, then represented professionally Lokomotiv Plovdiv (1981–88, 1997–98), Panathinaikos (1988–90), Athinaikos (1991–92) and Edessaikos (1992–96).

For the  Bulgarian national team, he amassed 20 appearances, netting 8 goals. He played all four matches at the 1986 FIFA World Cup in Mexico.

Honours
 Lokomotiv Plovdiv
Cup of the Soviet army Winner: 1982-83

 Panathinaikos
Super League Greece Winner: 1989-90
Greek FA Cup Winner: 1988-89

 Edessaikos
Balkans Cup: Winner: 1992-93

References

External links

1964 births
Living people
Footballers from Plovdiv
Bulgarian footballers
Association football midfielders
Athinaikos F.C. players
First Professional Football League (Bulgaria) players
Edessaikos F.C. players
PFC Lokomotiv Plovdiv players
Panathinaikos F.C. players
Bulgaria international footballers
1986 FIFA World Cup players
Bulgarian expatriate footballers
Expatriate footballers in Greece
Bulgarian expatriate sportspeople in Greece
PFC Lokomotiv Plovdiv managers
Bulgarian football managers